Rasbora atridorsalis is a species of ray-finned fish in the genus Rasbora. It is found in the Mekong basin in Xishuangbanna and in Laos.

References

Rasboras
Freshwater fish of China
Fish of Laos
Taxa named by Maurice Kottelat
Taxa named by Chu Xin-Luo
Fish described in 1988